Wondering may refer to:

"Wondering" (Dirty Pretty Things song)
"Wondering" (Patti Page song)
"Wondering" (Claire Sproule song)
"Wondering" (Webb Pierce song)
"Wondering", a song by Good Charlotte from The Young and the Hopeless
"Wondering", a song by Xiu Xiu from Forget